This is an incomplete list of casinos in Canada as of around 2011:

Type:
Resort (R)
Destination (D)
Community (C)
Racing entertainment centre (REC)

Ownership:
Government owned (GO)
First Nations (FN)
Private facility (PF)
Privately operated (PO)
Charitable (C)
Not-for-profit (NFP)

Facilities:
Slots (S)
Slots-At-Racetracks (SAR)
Racino (R)
Video lottery terminal (V)

*OLG = Ontario Lottery and Gaming Corporation

See also
List of casinos and horse racing tracks in Alberta
List of casinos in the United States
Société des casinos du Québec

References

 Casinos